The men's doubles of the 2020 I.ČLTK Prague Open tournament was played on clay in Prague, Czech Republic.

Ariel Behar and Gonzalo Escobar were the defending champions but chose not compete this year.

Pierre-Hugues Herbert and Arthur Rinderknech won the title after defeating Zdeněk Kolář and Lukáš Rosol 6–3, 6–4 in the final.

Seeds

Draw

References

External links
 Main draw

I.ČLTK Prague Open - Doubles